George of Antioch (died 1151 or 1152) was the first to hold the office of ammiratus ammiratorum (emir of emirs) in the Norman Kingdom of Sicily. He was a Syrian-born Byzantine Christian of Greek ancestry.  He was born in Antioch, whence he moved with his father, Michael, and mother to Tunisia following the First Crusade. He and his parents found employment under the Zirid emir, Tamim ibn Muizz. George fell out with Tamim's son and successor, Yahya, and secretly left for Christian Sicily by stealing away in disguise aboard a Palermitan ship harbored in Mahdia. Upon arrival in the Sicilian capital, George went immediately to the palace and found service with the Norman count, Roger II.



Rise and early career: subjugation of Apulia

George of Antioch's prior knowledge of the Zirid administration, his connections with an Armenian official in Fatimid Egypt, and knowledge of Greek and Arabic led to his rise in the Norman administration. He rose to the title of familiaris of the court and by 1123 had risen to second in command in Christodulus' navy. In these years, he also served as a frequent envoy to the Fatimid court in Cairo. In a Norman attack on Mahdia that year, George captured the fortress of ad-Dimas, located on the coast of Tunisia, but the campaign resulted in a decisive Norman defeat at the hands of the Zirid emir, al-Hasan ibn Ali. In the following five years, George overshadowed Chrisotodulus and by 1127 had replaced him in the position of emir of Palermo. In that year, both emirs were present at Montescaglioso with Count Roger, but Christodulus seems to have died soon thereafter and George succeeded him.

George was instrumental in fully subduing independent-minded Apulia and Calabria in the years following Roger's succession there. In 1129, George brought sixty ships to bear on besieged Bari, then rebellious under Prince Grimoald Alferanites. Surrender was forced, but Roger pardoned the prince. In 1131, Roger demanded that the citizens of Amalfi turn over the keys to the castle as well as full control over their city's defences. The Amalfitans refused and George blockaded the city and captured all Amalfitan ships, forcing the city to surrender. In 1132, George was given the title ammiratus ammiratorum, which translates as Admiral of Admirals in modern English, but was understood as Emir of Emirs to his contemporaries. He was also given the Greek title "Archon of Archons".

In 1143, George founded the Greek Orthodox church of S. Maria dell'Ammiraglio, also known as the Martorana, in Palermo. In the church there is a contemporary mosaic depicting George, as well as a mosaic showing Roger II being crowned by Christ.

Height of career: conquests in Greece and Africa

In 1146, George captured Tripoli and established Sicilian authority in North Africa on a permanent basis. He had already captured several minor coastal cities in the fifteen years prior, but Mahdia, which had been in the hands of Abul-Hasan al-Hasan ibn Ali since the failed attack of 1123, did not capitulate yet.

In 1147, Roger attacked the Byzantine Empire, which continued to contest his gains in southern Italy. George he sent from Otranto with seventy galleys to assault Corfu. According to Nicetas Choniates, the island capitulated due to the imperial tax burden and George's promises. Leaving a garrison, George sailed on to the Peloponnesus. He sacked Athens and quickly moved on to the Ionian Islands. He ravaged the coast all along Euboea and the Gulf of Corinth and penetrated as far as Thebes, where he pillaged the silk factories and carried off the Jewish silk weavers. George capped the expedition with a sack of Corinth, in which the relics of Saint Theodore were stolen, and then returned to Sicily.

In 1148, George finally conquered Mahdia. Antecedently, the governor of Gabès had revolted against his overlord, al-Hasan, and promised to deliver his city to Roger II if he was confirmed as governor. War inevitably broke out in the summer of 1148. George led a fleet against Mahdia. The sultan voluntarily went into exile, taking with him very little treasure, and Mahdia capitulated. The cities of Sfax and Soussa surrendered soon after. Tunisia (Ifriqiya) was incorporated into the Kingdom of Sicily, which reached its apogee through George's conquests, containing not only Sicily and the Mezzogiorno, but also Corfu and Tunisia.

In 1149, Corfu was retaken and George took a fleet of forty ships up the Bosphorus to the walls of Constantinople, where he tried to land. Failing this, he ravaged a few villae on the Asian coast and fired arrows at the imperial palace. He died soon after, in year 546 AH according to Ibn al-Athir, corresponding to 1151 or 1152. He was succeeded in his offices by Philip of Mahdia.

George was a polyglot and very cultured man. He founded the church of San Michele in Mazara del Vallo. Besides that and his eponymous church, George of Antioch left as an architectural monument the seven-arched Admiral's Bridge over the River Oreto by Palermo where, on May 27, 1860, Giuseppe Garibaldi's Redshirts first fought the troops of Francis II of the Two Sicilies in the Risorgimento.

Notes

Sources
 Norwich, John Julius. The Normans in the South 1016–1130. London: Longman, 1967.
 Norwich, John Julius. The Kingdom in the Sun 1130–1194. London: Longman, 1970.
 Aubé, Pierre. Roger II de Sicile. 2001.

11th-century births
1150s deaths
People from Antioch
Medieval admirals
Syrian people of Greek descent
Military history of the Kingdom of Sicily
Italian admirals
Ambassadors to the Fatimid Caliphate